Zoya Grigorievna Polunina (born June 12, 1991) is a women's ice hockey player from Russia. Currently, she plays for Tornado in Russia's Level 1 league for women. In spring 2012, she registered for the 2012 CWHL Draft.

Playing career

Russian national team
Polunina has been a member of the Russian national team since 2009. Recently, she competed at the 2012 IIHF Women's World Championship.

Awards and honors
Russian League champion (2010–11, 2011–12)
European champion (2009–10, 2011–12)

References

1991 births
Living people
Ice hockey players at the 2010 Winter Olympics
Olympic ice hockey players of Russia
Sportspeople from Ryazan
Russian women's ice hockey defencemen
Universiade medalists in ice hockey
Universiade silver medalists for Russia
Competitors at the 2013 Winter Universiade
HC Tornado players